The Battle of Pyongyang was the second major land battle of the First Sino-Japanese War.  It took place on 15 September 1894 in Pyongyang, Korea between the forces of Meiji Japan and Qing China. It is sometimes referred to archaically in Western sources as the "Battle of Ping-yang". Between 13,000 and 15,000 Chinese troops of the Beiyang Army under overall command of General Ye Zhichao had arrived in Pyongyang on 4 August 1894, and had made extensive repairs to its ancient city walls, feeling itself secure in its superior numbers and in the strength of the defenses.

Prince Yamagata Aritomo's First Army of the Imperial Japanese Army converged on Pyongyang from several directions on 15 September 1894, and in the morning made a direct attack on the north and southeast corners of the walled city under very little cover. The Chinese defense was strong, but was eventually outmaneuvered by an unexpected flanking attack by the Japanese from the rear, costing the Chinese very heavy losses compared to the Japanese.

Background

Chinese preparations at Pyongyang
Although the Chinese were defeated by the Japanese at Seonghwan, the bulk of the Chinese forces in Korea were not stationed near Seonghwan but in the northern city of Pyongyang.
The city lies on the right bank of the Taedong River, which was large enough to provide a shipping route to the sea. Of the Chinese troops deployed at Pyongyang, eight thousand arrived at the city by sea and another five thousand had to make the arduous overland journey from Manchuria. The forces in Pyongyang were joined by retreating Chinese troops from Asan under Ye Zhichao. By Chinese standards, the troops in Pyongyang had received modern training and equipment. Some of the infantry carried American Winchester rifles while the Chinese also had a total of four field artillery pieces, six machine-guns and twenty-eight mountain guns. Weapons, however, were not standardized and a major concern was the proper supply of ammunition.

Between early August and mid-September, the Chinese troops in Pyongyang reinforced the existing walled stronghold with massive earthworks, and the location of the city itself contributed to a substantial defensive position. Directly to the north were hills, and on the highest of these - Moktan-tei - there was a fortress that overlooked the entire area. To the east and south was the broad Taedong river, where forts had been built to deter any enemy from crossing. The terrain was open only to the southwest; this was where the Chinese had constructed solid redoubts.

Japanese advance to Pyongyang
After the victory over the Chinese at Seonghwan, the Japanese had a reinforced Brigade of about 8,000 soldiers in Korea under command of General Oshima. More than 7,000 of these troops were concentrated at Seoul and Chemulpo. The Japanese now had control of the southern and central part of the country. However, as the Chinese still had the bulk of their troops in the northern Korea, for the Japanese the military situation required an immediate deployment of reinforcements to Korea.

Since the main objective of the Japanese was the Chinese forces concentrated at Pyongyang, they had four routes on which to deploy their troops to Pyongyang; one through via Chemulpo, another through Pusan, one from Wonsan on the eastern coast of Korea or by landing directly at the mouth of the Taedong River in the immediate vicinity of Pyongyang. Since the Japanese were hard pressed for time, as part of their strategy they needed to drive the Chinese troops from Korea before winter to avoid prolongation of military operations. As a result the route leading through Pusan was rejected immediately; although transporting the troops there would not have been a problem for the Japanese as the transports would remain safely beyond the reach of the Chinese Fleet. The Japanese troops would have to travel over 650 km by land to reach Pyongyang, however considering the awful condition of Korean roads it would have taken them too much time to reach Pyongyang. The Japanese decided to transport the majority of their forces to Chemulpo on the west coast and with some to Wonsan, on the east. It was still not easy to reach Pyongyang from the Wonsan again to due to the condition of Korean roads, but the distance was only about 160 km  and the harbour was completely safe as Japanese transports could sail there without any escort. The Japanese did exclude the idea of landing troops at the mouth of the Taidong River, however due to the risk of such operation, it was considered a last resort.

In  Japan, a fleet of 30 transports had been commandeered for the conflict by the government, assembled near the port of Hiroshima, which was the primary harbour where Japanese troops were to be embarked for Korea. They were to depart from there in groups, heading for the coast of Korea without escort, there the transports heading for Chemulpo would be escorted by warships. The number of transports allowed the Japanese to redeploy no more than 10-15,000 troops to Korea at a time, this was also taking into consideration the fact that apart from soldiers there were substantial numbers of coolies, equipment and supplies to be transported meaning that the Japanese were able to redeploy one brigade at a time.

Japanese Strategy
The 10,000 troops (not confirmed) of the Imperial Japanese Army's 1st Army, under the overall command of Marshal Yamagata Aritomo consisted of the 5th Provincial Division (Hiroshima) under Lieutenant General , and the 3rd Provincial Division (Nagoya) under Lieutenant General Katsura Tarō. Japanese forces had landed at Chemulpo (modern Inchon, Korea) on 12 June 1894 without opposition. After a brief sortie south for the Battle of Seonghwan on 29 July 1894, the First Army marched north towards Pyongyang, rendezvousing with reinforcements, which had landed via the ports of Busan and Wonsan.

Although the Japanese forces were under the overall command of General Yamagata and he was responsible for orchestrating the strategy at Pyongyang, Yamagata did not land with his forces at Chempulo until 12 September. Lieutenant-General Nozu Michitsura commanded the Japanese troops involved in the attack on Pyongyang; which included the Wonson column under Colonel Sato Tadashi, the Sangnyong column under Major-General Tatsumi Naobumi, the Combined Brigade under Major-General Oshima Yoshimasa and finally the Main Division under Nozu himself. The plan of attack was for the Combined Brigade to make the frontal assault from the south, while the Main Division attacked from the southwest. Flanking actions would then be carried out by the two columns. If the Chinese tried to retreat, the Wonson column was given the duty of intercepting and harrying the enemy as it fled to the northeast.

Events of the Battle

Arrival of Japanese troops
The Main Division attacked from the southwest early during the morning of 15 September 1894. Following a twelve-hour battle, the Chinese repulsed this force. Heavy rain turned the battlefield into a field of mud covered with the wounded, supply carts, and horses. Meanwhile, the Combined Brigade attacked the forts protecting the southern bank of the Taedong River. However, Japanese artillery was too far back to be effective and by nightfall the Japanese evacuated the few earthworks they had captured. The apparent inability of these two divisions to take Pyongyang led to initial newspaper reports that China had won the battle, which later turned out to be false.

In reality, the Wonsan and Sangnyong columns succeeded in taking the Chinese fortress at Moktan-tei which was to the north of Pyongyang. From that position Japanese artillery could fire across the city walls and this position of strength forced the Chinese to offer to surrender at 16:30 on 15 September 1894. The Chinese commander promised that his troops would remain within the city gates, but since it was already getting dark, the Japanese declined to enter the city until the following day. During the evening of 15 September, many Chinese troops tried to flee for the coast and the border town of Wiju (modern village of Uiju, North Korea) on the lower reaches of the Yalu River). Japanese snipers killed large numbers of Chinese on the northern roads. As a result of the Chinese surrender, early the following morning the two Japanese columns entered the northern gate of the city unopposed. There was no way to communicate their success to the rest of the Japanese Army, however, so when the Main Division began its attack on the city's West Gate the next day, they were surprised to find the gate undefended. Later that morning, the Combined Brigade entered the city through the South Gate. Throughout the battle of Pyongyang, the Chinese troops fought valiantly, but were unable to counter the greater training and morale of the Japanese troops.

Chinese casualties are estimated at 2,000 killed, and around 4,000 wounded. The Japanese lost 102 men killed, 433 wounded and 33 missing.

Aftermath
After the Battle of Pyongyang, command of Japanese First Army was turned over from Marshal Yamagata to General Nozu for reasons of health. Nozu's former command of the 5th division was assumed by Lieutenant General Oku Yasukata.
After the Battle of Pyongyang, the Japanese advanced north to the Yalu River without opposition. The Chinese had decided (as would the Russians ten years later in the Russo-Japanese War) to abandon northern Korea and defend from the northern bank of the Yalu River.

Qing Muslim General Zuo Baogui (1837–1894), from Shandong province, died in action in Pyongyang, from Japanese artillery. A memorial to him was constructed. Before the battle Zuo Baogui performed ablution (Wudu or Ghusl) according to Islamic custom.

See also
 Harada Jūkichi

References

Bibliography

Further reading
 Chamberlin, William Henry. Japan Over Asia, 1937, Little, Brown, and Company, Boston, 395 pp.
 Kodansha Japan: An Illustrated Encyclopedia, 1993, Kodansha Press, Tokyo 
 Lone, Stewart. Japan's First Modern War: Army and Society in the Conflict with China, 1894–1895, 1994,  St. Martin's Press, New York, 222 pp.
 Paine, S.C.M. The Sino-Japanese War of 1894–1895: Perception, Power, and Primacy, 2003,  Cambridge University Press, Cambridge, MA, 412 pp.
 Warner, Dennis and Peggy. The Tide At Sunrise, 1974, Charterhouse, New York, 659 pp.

Pyongyang
Pyongyang
1894 in China
1894 in Japan
1894 in Korea
19th century in Pyongyang
September 1894 events